Gerhard Weisenberger (born 30 January 1952 in Kleinostheim) is a German former wrestler who competed in the 1972 Summer Olympics and in the 1976 Summer Olympics.

References

External links
 

1952 births
Living people
Olympic wrestlers of West Germany
Wrestlers at the 1972 Summer Olympics
Wrestlers at the 1976 Summer Olympics
German male sport wrestlers